The Reynolds's Pamphlet is a famous document written by Alexander Hamilton, one of America's founding fathers, in response to allegations of his extramarital affair with Maria Reynolds. The pamphlet was published in 1797, and it quickly became a sensation, drawing a lot of attention from the public and the press. The document contained Hamilton's version of events surrounding his relationship with Maria Reynolds, as well as detailed explanations of his financial dealings with her husband, James Reynolds.

The Reynolds's Pamphlet was a remarkable document for several reasons. Firstly, it was unprecedented for a public figure to respond to such allegations with such a detailed account of their private life. Hamilton's honesty and transparency were both praised and criticized by his contemporaries, with some admiring his courage, while others questioned his judgment.

Secondly, the Reynolds's Pamphlet was a masterclass in persuasive writing. Hamilton's arguments were carefully crafted to undermine the credibility of his accusers while casting doubt on their motives. He used logic, rhetoric, and emotional appeals to make his case, drawing on his reputation as a brilliant lawyer and writer to sway public opinion in his favor.

Despite Hamilton's efforts, the Reynolds's Pamphlet did little to quell the controversy surrounding his affair. In fact, it only served to intensify public scrutiny of his personal life, with some accusing him of using the pamphlet to deflect attention from his misdeeds. Hamilton's opponents also seized upon the document to attack his character, painting him as a hypocrite who preached morality but failed to live up to his own standards.

The Reynolds's Pamphlet also had a lasting impact on Hamilton's political career. While it may have helped him salvage his reputation in the short term, it ultimately contributed to his downfall. The pamphlet revealed Hamilton's willingness to engage in questionable financial transactions, which made him vulnerable to charges of corruption later in his career. It also alienated many of his political allies, who viewed his actions as reckless and damaging to the Federalist cause.

Despite its controversial legacy, the Reynolds's Pamphlet remains an important historical document that sheds light on the complex personal and political dynamics of the early American republic. It is a testament to Hamilton's brilliance as a writer and his willingness to take risks in defense of his reputation, as well as a cautionary tale about the dangers of public scandal and the perils of mixing personal and political ambition.

The Reynolds's Pamphlet is also significant because it reflects the societal norms and attitudes of the time in which it was written. The pamphlet reveals how extramarital affairs were viewed by the public in the late eighteenth century and how they could be used as a tool to damage a person's reputation and career. It also highlights the double standards that existed around sexual morality and the role of women in society.

In many ways, the Reynolds's Pamphlet is a microcosm of the tensions and conflicts that characterized the early American republic. It reflects the struggle between personal and political ambition, the clash of competing ideologies, and the challenges of building a nation from a diverse and often fractious population. As such, it is a valuable resource for historians, scholars, and anyone interested in the history of the United States.

The Reynolds's Pamphlet is a seminal document in American history that offers a window into the personal and political world of Alexander Hamilton. While it may have been controversial and divisive in its time, it remains an important piece of writing that sheds light on the complex and often contradictory forces that shaped the early American republic. Whether viewed as a cautionary tale or a testament to Hamilton's brilliance, the Reynolds's Pamphlet remains a fascinating and enduring work of literature.

Background
In the summer of 1791, 23-year-old Maria Reynolds allegedly approached the married 34-year-old Alexander Hamilton in Philadelphia to request his help and financial aid by claiming that her husband, James, had abandoned her. Hamilton did not have any money on his person and so he retrieved her address to deliver the funds in person. Once Hamilton arrived at the boarding house at which Maria was lodging, she brought him upstairs and led him into her bedroom.
He later recounted, "I took the bill out of my pocket and gave it to her. Some conversation ensued from which it was quickly apparent that other than pecuniary consolation would be acceptable." The two began an illicit affair that would last, with varying frequency, until approximately June 1792.

Over the course of those months, while the affair took place, James Reynolds was well aware of his wife's unfaithfulness. He continually supported their relationship to gain regular blackmail money from Hamilton.

In the Reynolds Pamphlet, Hamilton goes as far as to argue that James Reynolds, along with his wife, had conspired the scheme to "extort money from me." The common practice in the day was for the wronged husband to seek retribution in a pistol duel, but Reynolds, realizing how much Hamilton had to lose if the activity came into public view, insisted on monetary compensation instead. After Hamilton had shown unequivocal signs that he wanted to end the affair in autumn 1791, Hamilton received two letters on December 15, 1791, one each from Mrs. and Mr. Reynolds. The first letter, from Maria, warned of her husband's knowledge and of James' attempting to blackmail Hamilton.
By then, Hamilton discontinued the affair and briefly ceased to visit, but both James and Maria were apparently involved in the blackmailing scheme, as both sent letters inviting Hamilton to continue his visits. After extorting $1000 in exchange for secrecy over Hamilton's adultery, James Reynolds rethought his request for Hamilton to cease his relationship with Maria and wrote inviting him to renew his visits "as a friend," only to extort forced "loans" after each visit, which the most-likely-colluding Maria solicited with her letters.
By May 2, 1792, James changed his mind again and requested for Hamilton to stop seeing his wife but not before James had received additional payment. In the end, the blackmail payments totaled over $1,300 including the initial extortion.

Hamilton had possibly become aware of both Reynoldses being involved in the blackmail and both welcomed and strictly complied with James' request to end the affair.

The historian Tilar J. Mazzeo has advanced a theory that the affair never happened. Outside of the Reynolds Pamphlet, there is no evidence that the affair actually occurred. Others connected with the scandal, from James Monroe, who held the papers relating to James Reynolds, to Maria Reynolds herself, said that it was a coverup for a financial scandal. Hamilton never produced the manuscript copies of Maria's letters, but both the newspapers and Maria suggested obtaining a handwriting sample. Hamilton said that they had been placed with a friend, who claimed that he had never seen them, which suggests that the letters may have been forged.

The newspaper writers also pointed out that Maria's letters correctly spell long, complex words but sometimes misspelled simple words in a way that made no phonetic sense. As the Thomas Jefferson biographer Julian P. Boyd stated, the letters could resemble what an educated man believed an uneducated woman's love letters to look like. A Hamilton biographer also stated that the letters look like the letters between Alexander and his wife, Eliza, which could explain why Eliza burned her letters.

Scandal
In November 1792, after James Reynolds was jailed for participation in a scheme involving unpaid back wages intended for Revolutionary War veterans, he used his own knowledge about Hamilton's sex affair to bargain his way out of his own troubles.
Reynolds knew that Hamilton would have to choose between revealing his affair with Maria or falsely admitting complicity to the charges.
James Monroe, Abraham Venable, and Frederick Muhlenberg were the first men to hear of this possible corruption within the nation's new government, and on December 15, 1792, they decided to confront Hamilton personally with the information that they had received, supported by the notes of Hamilton's payments to Reynolds that Maria had given them to corroborate her husband's accusations.

Denying any financial impropriety, Hamilton revealed the true nature of his relationship with the Reynoldses in all of its unsavory details. He turned over the letters from both of them.

Apparently convinced that Hamilton was not guilty of the charge of public misconduct, Monroe, Venable, and Muhlenberg agreed not to make public the information and documents on the Reynolds Affair. Monroe and his colleagues assured Hamilton that the matter was settled. However, Monroe sent the letters to his close personal friend, Thomas Jefferson. Jefferson and Hamilton were self-described nemeses, and five years after receiving the letters, Jefferson used the knowledge to start rumors about Hamilton's private life.

Also in 1797, when Hamilton no longer held the post of Secretary of the Treasury, the details of his relationship with Maria and James Reynolds came to light in a series of pamphlets authored by the journalist James Thomson Callender. Included were copies of the documents that Hamilton had furnished to the Monroe commission in December 1792.

Hamilton confronted Monroe over the leakage of the supposedly-confidential documents. Monroe denied any responsibility. Hamilton came very close to calling Monroe a liar, and Monroe retorted that Hamilton was a scoundrel and challenged him to a duel. The duel was averted by the intercession of none other than Aaron Burr, who years later would ironically challenge and kill Hamilton in a duel. After writing a first draft in July 1797, on August 25, Hamilton responded to Callender's revelations by printing his own 95-page pamphlet, Observations on Certain Documents, later known as the "Reynolds Pamphlet," in which he denied all charges of corruption. However, he openly admitted his relationship with Maria Reynolds and apologized for it.

While his candor was admired, the affair severely damaged his reputation. While Hamilton's admitted affair served to confirm rival Jefferson's conviction that he was untrustworthy, it did nothing to change Washington's opinion of him, who still held him in "very high esteem" and still viewed him as the dominant force in establishing the federal law and government.

In popular culture

This early sex scandal in American history has received multiple fictional portrayals.

Theater and film
A stage play, Hamilton, ran on Broadway in 1917, was co-written by George Arliss, who also played the title role. Jeanne Eagels portrayed Maria Reynolds and Pell Trenton played James Reynolds.
The biographical film Alexander Hamilton, based upon the 1917 play, was released in 1931, with George Arliss reprising his role. June Collyer portrayed Maria Reynolds and Ralf Harolde portrayed James Reynolds.
In the 2015 musical Hamilton, written by Lin-Manuel Miranda (who also debuted the title role), the Reynolds affair is a key moment in the Second Act. It figures into the following songs:
"Say No to This", in which the affair begins.
"We Know", in which Hamilton is confronted by Burr, Jefferson, and James Madison.
"Hurricane", in which Hamilton decides to write the Reynolds Pamphlet.
"The Reynolds Pamphlet", in which Hamilton is humiliated by Burr, Jefferson and Madison as his affair is revealed.
"Burn", which depicts Hamilton's wife, Eliza, burning all of her letters to him in response to the Pamphlet's publication, the events the Pamphlet describes and then suggesting that Hamilton himself "burn."
On July 3rd, 2020, Disney+ released the film Hamilton, an authorized film of the Broadway stage production, with Miranda playing Hamilton, Jasmine Cephas Jones playing Maria Reynolds, and Sydney-James Harcourt playing James Reynolds. All three actors were part of the Original Broadway Cast.

Literature
Scandalmonger (2000), by William Safire.
The Whiskey Rebels (2008), by David Liss.
The Hamilton Affair (2016), by Elizabeth Cobbs.
I, Eliza Hamilton (2017), by Susan Holloway Scott.
My Dear Hamilton (2018), by Stephanie Dray and Laura Kamoie.
Eliza Hamilton: The Extraordinary Life and Times of the Wife of Alexander Hamilton (2018), by Tilar J. Mazzeo.

Television
George Washington II: The Forging of a Nation, a 1986 television miniseries, includes the events of the affair. Richard Bekins portrayed Hamilton, with Lise Hilboldt portraying Maria Reynolds.

See also 
 List of federal political sex scandals in the United States

References

Sources
 

Mazzeo, Tilar (2018). Eliza Hamilton. New York: Simon and Schuster.

Further reading
 Cerniglia, Keith A. "An Indelicate Amor: Alexander Hamilton and the First American Political Sex Scandal," Master's Thesis, Florida State University, Tallahassee, Florida, 2002.

 Cogan, Jacob Katz. "The Reynolds Affair and the Politics of Character." Journal of the Early Republic 16, no. 3 (1996): 389–417,

External links

Letters of James Monroe regarding the Reynolds affair in 1792 and other related archives
Original Draft of The Reynolds Pamphlet
Printed Version of the “Reynolds Pamphlet”, 1797

 American fraudsters
 History of New York City
 Alexander Hamilton
Federal political sex scandals in the United States
1791 in the United States
1791 crimes in the United States